Boss 2: Back to Rule is a 2017 India-Bangladesh joint production Bengali action thriller film directed by Baba Yadav and story written by Jeet. It is a sequel to his 2013 film, Boss: Born to Rule and the second installment of the Boss film series. The film features Jeet, Subhashree Ganguly and Bangladeshi actress Nusraat Faria in the leading roles. Jeet Gannguli composed the music for the film. The film was released in West Bengal on 23 June and in Bangladesh on 26 June 2017, and in the rest of India on 30 June 2017.

Plot 
Surya, a public figure who is now hated by the people of India due to the disappearance of their money kept in Business bank, a bank built by Surya for his people. Gopinath, Surya's loved minister, was killed by an unknown person due to various enmities. Surya was forced to leave India due to repeated threats by the people and the police. He dressed as a Rock musician and sneaked into Dhaka, Bangladesh, to look for Prince Shahnawaz Hussain, who had earlier promised to donate a huge sum for his company, Surya Industries. But later, he discovered that he betrayed him and went to Bangkok, Thailand. In Dhaka, Aisha, who was actually Shahnawaz's daughter, helped Surya to overcome various problems and come to Bangkok. In Bangkok, during an action scene on the top of Shahnawaz's building, it is shown that Bidyut Shivalkar, Gopinath's son, who Surya had believed to be his friend due to his enormous contributions to his industry, was the one who tricked Surya by stealing all the money in the bank to become wealthy. He is also the man who killed his father by gunfire due to greed for the property. The people who helped him were Prince Shahnawaz Hussain and Jagadish Kumar, another politician friend of Gopinath, with the same intention. Surya escaped them by jumping down the building using a rope. He is soon able to kill Shahnawaz with the help of Aisha, who hates her father for killing many people, including her mother. He also is able to fatally poison Avinash while asleep, in spite of the huge security. But then Bidyut captures Aisha and Rusha, Surya's lover. But finally, in an action scene, he is able to save both of them and gets hold of Bidyut. He also thus is able to win back the lost money. Bidyut is sent to jail, and a victorious Surya is once again able to bring happiness to his people and criticizes them for losing their trust on him. Finally, Surya regains the people's trust.

Cast
 Jeet as a small business tycoon Surya, who aspires to work at the national level with the help of ministers
 Subhashree Ganguly as Rusha Roy, Surya's fiancé
 Nusraat Faria as Aisha Hussain: The daughter of Prince Shahnawaz Hussain)
 Chiranjeet Chakraborty as Mumbai Police Commissioner Vinayak Roy
 Indraneil Sengupta as Bidyut Shivalkar
 Supriyo Dutta as Chief Minister Gopinath Shivalkar, Bidyut's father
 Biswanath Basu as Shibcharan Chowdhury
 Kaushik Sen as Deputy Chief Minister Jagadish Kumar
 Amit Hasan as Prince Shahnawaz Hussain, a corrupt Bangladeshi businessman
 Pradip Dhar as constable Tukaram Apte
 Sabyasachi Chakraborty as the narrator
 Kanchan Mullick as stuntman (cameo)
 Somnath Kar as Shakeel, Surya's henchman

Production
Boss 2: Back To Rule is an Indo-Bangla joint production involving Jeet's new production company Jeetz Filmworks, Walzen Media Works and Jaaz Multimedia. It is a sequel to the film Boss: Born to Rule. Principal photography was underway in Kolkata in February 2017.

Controversy 
After being uploaded on to Jaaz Multimedia's YouTube channel, the song "Allah Meherbaan" ("By the Grace of Allah") stirred up controversy due to its title being perceived as an Islamic song. Nusrat was criticised for appearing in revealing costumes in the music video. After viewing the video, advocate Md Azizul Bashar, for a publicity stunt, claimed he was 'embarrassed' after allegedly mistaking the song to be a religious song. A legal notice, on behalf of Bashar, was sent by Supreme Court lawyer Md Hujjatul Islam Khan to Jaaz Multimedia for 'hurting the religious sentiments of everyone' by releasing a 'disgraceful' song before the month of Ramadan. The notice gave three days to remove the song from YouTube and other social media networks. After the notice was sent, Jaaz Multimedia removed the music video from their YouTube channel.

Another controversy came from Bangladesh towards the film, this time regarding the joint production between Bangladesh and India. According to the joint production rules of Bangladesh, the film must share half of the actors from either country. The preliminary preview committee of the censor board raised the allegation after reviewing the film. After reviewing the film, the chief of the committee and managing director of the BFDC (Bangladesh Film Development Organization), Tapan Kumar Ghosh, told me this."Most of the artistes in the film are from India. It seems to me that in the case of actors, the principles of a joint production have not been followed," Tapan Kumar Ghosh said. After a few weeks of protests, the Censor Board gave clearance to the films to release, in time to release on the holiday of Eid.

Soundtrack

Yaara Meherbaan 
After the backlash in Bangladesh against the release of the song "Allah Meherbaan", Jaaz Multimedia received a legal notice and removed the music video from their YouTube channel. On 13 June, Jaaz Multimedia released an updated version of the song with rewritten lyrics onto their YouTube channel. The new version of the song on YouTube is titled "Yaara Meherbaan". Grassroot Entertainment also removed the original song from their YouTube channel and replaced it with "Yaara Meherbaan". However, the single and soundtrack released on different platforms such as iTunes, Spotify, and Saavn all retain the original "Allah Meherbaan" song.

References

External links
 

Bengali-language Bangladeshi films
Indian crime thriller films
Indian action thriller films
Films scored by Jeet Ganguly
Indian crime action films
Indian gangster films
2017 crime thriller films
2017 action thriller films
2017 crime action films
2017 films
2010s Bengali-language films
Indian sequel films
Bengali-language Indian films
Bangladeshi sequel films
Films directed by Baba Yadav
Bangladeshi action thriller films
Bangladeshi crime thriller films
Jaaz Multimedia films